Brent railway station was on the South Devon Railway, serving the village of South Brent on the southern edge of Dartmoor in Devon, England.

The line through Brent opened on 5 May 1848 but the station was not ready to open until 15 June 1848.

The South Devon Railway was amalgamated with the Great Western Railway on 1 February 1876. On 19 December 1893 the station became a junction, with the opening of the branch to Kingsbridge. 
The station closed in 1964.

Further reading
 The Great Western in South Devon by Keith Beck and John Copsey, Wild Swan Publications 1990, 
 An Illustrated History of Plymouth's Railways by Martin Smith, Irwell Press 1995,  
 The South Devon Railway by R H Gregory, Oakwood Press1982, 
 The records of the South Devon Railway and its successors can be consulted at The National Archives

References

Disused railway stations in Devon
Railway stations in Great Britain opened in 1848
Railway stations in Great Britain closed in 1964
Former Great Western Railway stations
Beeching closures in England